Gourhati  is a village in the Arambagh CD block in the Arambagh subdivision of the Hooghly district in the Indian state of West Bengal.

Geography

Location

Area overview
The Arambagh subdivision, presented in the map alongside, is divided into two physiographic parts – the Dwarakeswar River being the dividing line. The western part is upland and rocky – it is extension of the terrain of neighbouring Bankura district. The eastern part is flat alluvial plain area.  The railways, the roads and flood-control measures have had an impact on the area. The area is overwhelmingly rural with 94.77% of the population living in rural areas and 5.23% of the population living in urban areas.

Note: The map alongside presents some of the notable locations in the subdivision. All places marked in the map are linked in the larger full screen map.

Demographics
As per the 2011 Census of India, Gaurhati had a total population of 13,084 of which 6,716 (51%) were males and 6,368 (49%) were females. Population in the age range 0–6 years was 1,380. The total number of literate persons in Gaurhati was 9,442 (80.67% of the population over 6 years).

Education
There (Gourhati-II) are two no's of High School one for Girls (Up to 10 th Class, Name - Gourhati Durgadas Balika Vidyalaya) and another for Boys (Up to 12 Class, Class 5 th to 10 th for Boys, after 10 th class Co-ed, Name - Gourhati Haradas Institution)

Culture
David J. McCutchion mentions:
Gangadhara Siva temple as a small at chala having a single entrance, with terracotta decoration, built in 1752. 
Dolmancha as a pancha ratna with crude terracotta figures.

Gourhati picture gallery

Note: Some pictures are wrongly marked as belonging to Basudebpur. This should be ignored. It has been taken care of at the time of categorisation.

References

External links

Villages in Hooghly district